Juan Engelberth Murillo Ortíz (born August 1, 1982) is a Venezuelan professional road racing cyclist.

Doping
On 1 August 2017 Murillo tested positive for EPO-CERA during the Tour de Guadeloupe and was later banned for four years and fined €10,000.

Major results

2004
 1st Stage 2 Doble Sucre Potosí GP Cemento Fancesa
 3rd Road race, Pan American Under-23 Road Championships
2006
 1st Stage 12 Vuelta al Táchira
 1st Stage 2 Vuelta al Estado Yaracuy
 1st Stage 2 Vuelta Ciclista Aragua
 1st Stage 2 Vuelta a Venezuela
 1st Stage 4 Clásico Ciclístico Banfoandes
2007
 1st Stage 3 Vuelta al Táchira
 2nd Overall Vuelta a Bramon
1st Stage 3
 3rd Overall Vuelta al Oriente
2008
 8th Overall Vuelta al Táchira
 9th Overall Vuelta a Venezuela
2009
 4th Overall Vuelta al Táchira
1st Stage 4
2011
 2nd Overall Vuelta a Venezuela
 4th Overall Vuelta al Táchira
2012
 1st Stage 10 Vuelta al Táchira
2013
 2nd Road race, National Road Championships
 2nd Overall Vuelta a Venezuela
1st Stage 7
 6th Overall Vuelta al Táchira
1st Stage 3
2014
 2nd Overall Vuelta al Táchira
1st Stages 3 & 5
 3rd Overall Tour de Guadeloupe
1st  Points classification
1st Stages 1 & 2b (ITT)
 5th Overall Vuelta a Venezuela
2015
 1st  Road race, National Road Championships
 2nd Overall Vuelta al Táchira
1st  Points classification
1st Stage 8
 4th Overall Tour de Guadeloupe
2017
 2nd Overall Tour de Guadeloupe
1st Stages 2b (ITT) & 4

References

External links
 

Venezuelan cyclists

1982 births
Living people
Venezuelan male cyclists
Vuelta a Venezuela stage winners
Place of birth missing (living people)
20th-century Venezuelan people
21st-century Venezuelan people